Warre is a surname, and may refer to:

Edmond Warre (1837–1920), English rower and head master of Eton College
Émile Warré, French beekeeper who invented the Warré Hive
Francis Warre Warre-Cornish (1839–1916), British scholar and writer
Felix Warre (1879–1953), English rower
Sir Henry Warre (1819-1898), British Army officer
Richard Warre (c. 1649 – 1730), English official
Sir William Warre (1784–1853), British Army officer

See also
Warre baronets

Warr (surname)